Lee Ra-Jin (born January 10, 1990, in Seoul) is a South Korean sabre fencer. She won a silver medal, as a member of the South Korean fencing team, in the same weapon at the 2010 Asian Games in Guangzhou, China.

Lee represented South Korea at the 2012 Summer Olympics in London, where she competed in the women's individual sabre event, along with her teammate Kim Ji-Yeon, who eventually won the gold medal in the final. However, she lost the first preliminary round match to Venezuela's Alejandra Benitez, with a final score of 9–15.

References

External links

Profile – FIE
NBC Olympics Profile

1990 births
Living people
South Korean female fencers
South Korean sabre fencers
Olympic fencers of South Korea
Fencers at the 2012 Summer Olympics
Asian Games medalists in fencing
Fencers from Seoul
Fencers at the 2010 Asian Games
Fencers at the 2014 Asian Games
Asian Games gold medalists for South Korea
Asian Games silver medalists for South Korea
Medalists at the 2010 Asian Games
Medalists at the 2014 Asian Games
Universiade medalists in fencing
Universiade gold medalists for South Korea
Universiade bronze medalists for South Korea
South Korean Buddhists
Medalists at the 2011 Summer Universiade
Medalists at the 2013 Summer Universiade
21st-century South Korean women